Myllocerus undecimpustulatus, known generally as the Sri Lanka weevil or yellow-headed ravenous weevil, is a species of oriental broad-nosed weevil in the beetle family Curculionidae.

References

Further reading

External links

 

Entiminae
Beetles described in 1891
Insect pests of millets